Acropoma hanedai is a species of ray-finned fish, a lanternbelly from the family Acropomatidae. It occurs in the north-western Pacific Ocean from southern Japan to Taiwan. It is a food fish which is caught by trawling.

References

hanedai
Fish described in 1953